Gavrelle is a commune in the Pas-de-Calais department in the Hauts-de-France region of France.

Geography
The motorway junction of the A26 autoroute and the A1 autoroute is less than a mile away.

Population

Places of interest
 The church of St. Vaast, dating from the twentieth century.
 The Commonwealth War Graves Commission cemetery.

See also
Communes of the Pas-de-Calais department

References

External links

 Website of the commune of Gavrelle 
 The CWGC burials in the communal graveyard

Communes of Pas-de-Calais